Bulbophyllum abbreviatum is a species of orchid in the genus Bulbophyllum discovered in Madagascar and originally described by German botanist Rudolf Schlechter, from material collected by French botanist H. Perrier de la Bâthie in February 1912, which is now kept in the Muséum National d'Histoire Naturelle in Paris.

The plant is a pseudobulb epiphyte.

Cirrhopetalum abbreviatum
According to Seidenfadden this is a different species from Cirrhopetalum abbreviatum Rchb.f 1881, however other sources disagree, notably the Conference of the Parties to CITES and associated Plants and Nomenclature Committees.

According to the Kew World Checklist of Selected Plant Families, Cirrhopetalum abbreviatum is a synonym of Bulbophyllum trigonopus, of which Bulbophyllum abbreviatum (Rchb.f.) Rchb.f. ex Seidenf. as used in Dansk Bot. Ark. 29(1): 73 (1973) is a nomen illegitimum.  This is not accepted by the Kew World Checklist of Monocotyledons Database and the World Checklist of Seed Plants 3.

References

External links
 The Bulbophyllum-Checklist
 The Internet Orchid Species Photo Encyclopedia

abbreviatum
Orchids of Madagascar